Focal socialisation agency (or focal socialization agency) in sociology is the name given to the agency which is most influential in process of socialisation upon an individual. Typically the first focal socialisation agency is the family but is usually succeeded in this role by the education system upon the entering of education.

See also

 Primary socialisation
 Sociology of the family

Socialization